Ethnicon for the place name Madytus, often erroneously regarded as a small Thracian tribe, mentioned only in Liv. 38,40,7 in connection with the attack by Thracian tribes on Cn. Manlius Vulso in 188 BC.

See also
 Thracian tribes
 Livy

References

Ancient tribes in Thrace
Thracian tribes